Brighton is a census-designated place (CDP) in Monroe County, New York, United States. The population was 36,609 at the 2010 census. The CDP takes its name from locations in the county.

Town of Brighton, which is conterminously with the CDP, is a town south of the City of Rochester. The town has a community, also named Brighton, a suburb of Rochester.

Geography
Brighton is located at  (43.123363, -77.568115).

According to the United States Census Bureau, the CDP has a total area of 15.6 square miles (40.5 km2), of which 15.4 square miles (40.0 km2)  is land and 0.2 square mile (0.4 km2)  (1.09%) is water.

Demographics

As of the census of 2000, there were 35,584 people, 15,852 households, and 8,686 families residing in the CDP. The population density was 2,303.6 per square mile (889.3/km2). There were 16,703 housing units at an average density of 1,081.3/sq mi (417.4/km2). The racial makeup of the CDP was 86.09% White, 3.70% Black or African American, 0.10% Native American, 8.13% Asian, 0.03% Pacific Islander, 0.63% from other races, and 1.33% from two or more races. Hispanic or Latino of any race were 2.34% of the population.

There were 15,852 households, out of which 24.7% had children under the age of 18 living with them, 45.9% were married couples living together, 6.8% had a female householder with no husband present, and 45.2% were non-families. 36.3% of all households were made up of individuals, and 13.8% had someone living alone who was 65 years of age or older. The average household size was 2.14 and the average family size was 2.86.

In the CDP, the population was spread out, with 20.0% under the age of 18, 7.5% from 18 to 24, 29.9% from 25 to 44, 23.4% from 45 to 64, and 19.1% who were 65 years of age or older. The median age was 40 years. For every 100 females, there were 88.8 males. For every 100 females age 18 and over, there were 84.9 males.

The median income for a household in the CDP was $52,066, and the median income for a family was $70,436. Males had a median income of $46,292 versus $35,171 for females. The per capita income for the CDP was $32,642. About 3.0% of families and 6.1% of the population were below the poverty line, including 4.9% of those under age 18 and 5.2% of those age 65 or over.

References

Census-designated places in New York (state)
Rochester metropolitan area, New York
Census-designated places in Monroe County, New York